Elizabeth Gardner Taylor (later Campbell, February 22, 1916 – February 5, 1977) was a Canadian athlete who competed in the 1932 Summer Olympics and in the 1936 Summer Olympics. She was born in Ingersoll, Ontario.

In 1932 she was eliminated in the first round of the Olympic 80 metre hurdles event. Four years later she won the bronze medal in the 80 metre hurdles competition. She won the silver medal in the 80 metre hurdles contest at the 1934 Empire Games and as well at the 1934 Women's World Games.

References

External links
 
 Betty Taylor at Canada's Sports Hall of Fame
 
 

1916 births
1977 deaths
Canadian female hurdlers
Olympic track and field athletes of Canada
Athletes (track and field) at the 1932 Summer Olympics
Athletes (track and field) at the 1936 Summer Olympics
Olympic bronze medalists for Canada
Athletes (track and field) at the 1934 British Empire Games
Commonwealth Games silver medallists for Canada
Track and field athletes from Ontario
Commonwealth Games medallists in athletics
People from Ingersoll, Ontario
Medalists at the 1936 Summer Olympics
Olympic bronze medalists in athletics (track and field)
Women's World Games medalists
Medallists at the 1934 British Empire Games